The Upper Austrian Prealps is a mountain range in Austria which, according to the Categorisation of the Eastern Alps, covers the region between the valley of the Traun (Gmunden) in the west and the Enns valley in the east, from Steyr in the north. It is usually counted as part of the Enns- and Steyrtal Prealps and Salzkammergut Prealps (separated somewhat by the Steyr valley). Politically it covers the districts of Steyr-Land and Kirchdorf. Large parts are located within the Limestone Alps National Park.

It includes the following mountain groups:
 Sengsengebirge
 Reichraminger Hintergebirge

Other well-known peaks are the:
 Kremsmauer
 Kasberg
 Traunstein

The Totes Gebirge range in the south is no longer counted as part of the Prealps, but the Upper Austrian Limestone High Alps. The AVE classifies it as its own group.

External links 
 Mountain huts in the Upper Austrian Prealps—

 
Mountain ranges of the Alps
Northern Limestone Alps
Mountain ranges of Upper Austria
Regions of Upper Austria